Sean O' Sullivan (born 21 August 1998) is an Australian rugby league footballer who plays as a  and  for the Dolphins in the NRL. 

He previously played for the Sydney Roosters, Brisbane Broncos, New Zealand Warriors and the Penrith Panthers in the National Rugby League.

Background
O'Sullivan was born in Sydney, New South Wales, Australia. He is of Irish descent.

He played his junior rugby league for the Glenmore Park Brumbies in the Penrith Rugby League. He is the son of NRL recruitment officer Peter O'Sullivan. He's also the brother in-law of New Zealand Warriors front rower Matthew Lodge.

Playing career

2018
O'Sullivan made his first grade debut in round 18 of the 2018 NRL season for the Sydney Roosters against the Gold Coast also scoring a controversial try. O'Sullivan signed a two-year contract with the Brisbane Broncos on 17 August 2018 for the 2019 NRL season.

2020
O'Sullivan's stint with Brisbane ended at the conclusion of the 2020 NRL season where the club finished last on the table and claimed their first wooden spoon.

2021
O'Sullivan joined the New Zealand Warriors for the 2021 NRL season and made 12 appearances as the club missed out on the finals.  On 6 November 2021, he signed a one-year deal to join reigning premiers Penrith.

2022
O'Sullivan made his club debut for Penrith in round 1 of the 2022 NRL season filling in for the injured Nathan Cleary against Manly.
On 30 June 2022, O'Sullivan signed a three-year deal to join the newly admitted Dolphins (NRL) side starting in the 2023 season.
O'Sullivan spent most of the year playing for Penrith's NSW Cup team and played in their 29-22 grand final victory over Canterbury.

2023

References

External links
New Zealand Warriors profile
Brisbane Broncos profile
Sydney Roosters profile

1998 births
Living people
Australian rugby league players
Sydney Roosters players
Brisbane Broncos players
New Zealand Warriors players
Penrith Panthers players
Dolphins (NRL) players
Rugby league halfbacks
Rugby league players from Sydney
Wyong Roos players